The 2009 Morocco Tennis Tour – Marrakech was a professional tennis tournament played on outdoor red clay courts. It was part of the 2009 ATP Challenger Tour. It took place in Marrakech, Morocco between 16 and 22 March 2009.

Singles entrants

Seeds

Rankings are as of March 9, 2009.

Other entrants
The following players received wildcards into the singles main draw:
  Rabie Chaki
  Reda El Amrani
  Sherif Sabry
  Mehdi Ziadi

The following players received entry from the qualifying draw:
  Jan Hájek
  Malek Jaziri
  Adrián Menéndez Maceiras
  Dick Norman

Champions

Men's singles

 Marcos Daniel def.  Lamine Ouahab, 4–6, 7–5, 6–2

Men's doubles

 Rubén Ramírez Hidalgo /  Santiago Ventura def.  Alberto Martín /  Daniel Muñoz de la Nava, 6–3, 7–6(5)

External links
Morocco Tennis Tour official website

2009
Marrakech